Rio Claro is a city in the state of São Paulo in Brazil. The elevation is 613 m. It was incorporated as the village of São João Batista do Ribeirão Claro in 1827, and this incorporation is celebrated every year on June 24 as a municipal holiday.

The name was changed later to Rio Claro. Starting in the 19th century, Rio Claro attracted large numbers of immigrants from European countries, especially from Germany, Switzerland and Italy, but also from Spain, Portugal, some Eastern European countries, and a substantial community of Christian Arabs from the then Ottoman Empire (mostly Syrian and Lebanese).

Japanese immigrants arrived later. There is also a large population of Afro-Brazilians.

Rio Claro used to play a very important role in the railway system of São Paulo state.

Education
Rio Claro hosts one public university, UNESP, offering courses in Geology, Geography, Environmental Engineering, Mathematics, Physics, Computer Science, Physical Education, Ecology, Biology and Pedagogy (teacher training).

Facts 

Budget: R$178,542,000.00 (2005)
Infant mortality rate: 11.76 deaths/1,000 live births
Literacy: 94.9% (2000)
Life expectancy at birth: 71.34 years

Sports 

The city's two football (soccer) clubs are Rio Claro Futebol Clube, founded in 1909, and Associação Esportiva Velo Clube Rioclarense, founded in 1910.

References

External links 

  Rio Claro City Hall
  Canal Rio Claro - Rio Claro City Portal
  Guia Rio Claro - Rio Claro City Guide Portal
  Visite Rio Claro - Rio Claro Travel Tour

 
1827 establishments in Brazil
Populated places established in 1827